Outlaw Roundup is a 1944 American Western film directed by Harry L. Fraser and written by Elmer Clifton. The film stars Dave O'Brien, James Newill, Guy Wilkerson, Helen Chapman, Jack Ingram and I. Stanford Jolley. The film was released on February 10, 1944, by Producers Releasing Corporation.

In the film, Newill sings "Someone Is Waiting", "Forget Me Not" and "When the Western Sun Is Sinking" by Speed Hansen.

Plot

Cast          
Dave O'Brien as Tex Wyatt 
James Newill as Jim Steele 
Guy Wilkerson as Panhandle Perkins
Helen Chapman as Ruth Randall
Jack Ingram as Spade Norton
I. Stanford Jolley as Red Hayden
Charles King as Frank Harkins
Reed Howes as Rod Laidlow
Bud Osborne as Sheriff Jed Randall
Frank Ellis as Sam Panzer
Budd Buster as Dude Merrill

See also
The Texas Rangers series:
 The Rangers Take Over (1942)
 Bad Men of Thunder Gap (1943)
 West of Texas (1943)
 Border Buckaroos (1943)
 Fighting Valley (1943)
 Trail of Terror (1943)
 The Return of the Rangers (1943)
 Boss of Rawhide (1943)
 Outlaw Roundup (1944)
 Guns of the Law (1944)
 The Pinto Bandit (1944)
 Spook Town (1944)
 Brand of the Devil (1944)
 Gunsmoke Mesa (1944)
 Gangsters of the Frontier (1944)
 Dead or Alive (1944)
 The Whispering Skull (1944)
 Marked for Murder (1945)
 Enemy of the Law (1945)
 Three in the Saddle (1945)
 Frontier Fugitives (1945)
 Flaming Bullets (1945)

References

External links
 

1944 films
1940s English-language films
American Western (genre) films
1944 Western (genre) films
Producers Releasing Corporation films
Films directed by Harry L. Fraser
American black-and-white films
Revisionist Western (genre) films
1940s American films